Francis Marion "Butch" Sachse Jr. (July 24, 1917 – October 1, 1989) was an American professional basketball and football player. He played collegiately at Texas Tech University.

Professional careers

Football
Sachse's professional football career spanned three National Football League seasons. He played for the Brooklyn Dodgers (1943), Brooklyn Tigers (1944), and the Boston Yanks (1945). In 20 career games, he completed 32 of 75 pass attempts to go with three touchdowns and six interceptions.

Basketball
Sachse's basketball career was two seasons spent playing in the National Basketball League for the Oshkosh All-Stars. A guard, he averaged 4.5 points per game spanning the 1943–44 and 1944–45 seasons.

References

1917 births
1989 deaths
American men's basketball players
Basketball players from Dallas
Boston Yanks players
Brooklyn Dodgers (NFL) players
Brooklyn Tigers players
Guards (basketball)
Oshkosh All-Stars players
People from Memphis, Texas
Players of American football from Dallas
Texas A&M University alumni
Texas Tech Red Raiders basketball players
Texas Tech Red Raiders football players